Ullensaker Skiklubb is a Norwegian sports club from Ullensaker, founded in 1958. It has sections for alpine skiing, Telemark skiing, cross-country skiing, ski jumping, and biathlon.

World-level alpine skier Ole Kristian Furuseth was a member of the club. Other, lesser known members include ski jumpers Kim Rene Elverum Sorsell, and Jan Erik Strømberg, cross-country skier Silje Ekroll Jahren and alpine skier Cathrine Meisingset.

References
Official site 

Sports teams in Norway
Sports clubs established in 1958
1958 establishments in Norway
Sport in Akershus
Ullensaker
Ski jumping clubs in Norway